Elections to Bristol City Council were held on 1 May 1997.

Results

Avonmouth

Bishopston

Bishopsworth

Brislington East

Brislington West

Clifton

Cotham

Hartcliffe

Henbury

Hengrove

Henleaze

Horfield

Kingsweston

Knowle

Redland

Southmead

St. George East

St. George West

Stockwood

Stoke Bishop

Westbury-on-Trym

Whitchurch Park

Windmill Hill

References

1997
1997 English local elections
1990s in Bristol